Enrique 'Quique' Martín Sánchez (born 29 December 1972) is a Spanish retired footballer who played as a forward.

In a 20-year professional career he represented six teams, mainly Salamanca (three different spells). He amassed La Liga totals of 104 games and eight goals over the course of four seasons, with Mérida, Espanyol and Villarreal.

Football career
Martín was born in Avilés, Asturias. An unsuccessful youth graduate at FC Barcelona – only appeared for the reserve squad – he went on to represent five clubs in his extensive professional career (CP Mérida, RCD Espanyol, UD Salamanca, Villarreal CF and Terrassa FC), in both La Liga and the Segunda División. His debut in the Spanish top flight arrived in the 1995–96 season with Mérida, appearing in 37 games in an eventual relegation; he contributed with a career-best 15 goals in the following campaign, as the team returned to where they had come from.

With Castile and León's Salamanca, Martín was instrumental in the 2006 promotion from the third level. In 2007–08 he finished as the player with most matches played in division two, 338, adding that distinction to 13 league goals – squad best, joint-tenth in the competition – which earned him a one-year contract extension aged almost 36.

In 2009–10, Martín played almost 1,000 minutes less than in the previous season and also did not manage to find the net after scoring 25 times in the last two combined. Salamanca barely avoided relegation, finishing in 16th position.

In June 2011, after the side dropped down a tier, Martín retired from football at the age of 38 years and six months, having appeared in 529 games in both major levels of Spanish football combined (98 goals), 425 of those in the second division.

References

External links

1972 births
Living people
People from Avilés
Spanish footballers
Footballers from Asturias
Association football forwards
La Liga players
Segunda División players
Segunda División B players
FC Barcelona Atlètic players
CP Mérida footballers
RCD Espanyol footballers
UD Salamanca players
Villarreal CF players
Terrassa FC footballers
Spain youth international footballers